"Resonance" is the twenty-second single from T.M.Revolution released on June 11, 2008 in Japan by Epic Records Japan. "Resonance" was released three years after T.M.Revolution's twenty-first single "Vestige". The single was released in three types of editions: CD-only, CD+DVD and CD+Blu-ray Disc; this is the first time in history for an artist to release a CD+Blu-ray Disc format. The first edition releases also came with a "T.M.Revolution×Soul Eater Wide Cup" sticker. The PV uses segments from all his past music videos edited to make it look like he's singing the lyrics to "Resonance." "Resonance" is used as the opening theme to the anime Soul Eater, and the song "Soul's Crossing" on the single is used as the theme song to the video game based on the Soul Eater series, Soul Eater: Monotone Princess.

Track listing
CD
 "Resonance"
 "Soul's Crossing"

DVD/Blu-ray
 "Resonance" -music clip-

Oricon Chart Positions

References

External links
 CD-only information at Sony Music Shop 
 CD+DVD information at Sony Music Shop 
 CD+Blu-ray Disc information at Sony Music Shop 

2008 singles
2008 songs
Epic Records singles
Anime songs
Song articles with missing songwriters